Ingjerd Schou, née Schie (born 20 January 1955) is a Norwegian politician for the Conservative Party.

Born in Sarpsborg, Schou was elected to the Norwegian Parliament from Østfold in 2001. From 2001, when the second cabinet Bondevik held office, Schou was Minister of Social Affairs. She was replaced in a 2004 cabinet reshuffle. During this period her seat in parliament was taken by Carsten Dybevig. Schou was not re-elected in 2005, but instead served as a deputy representative.

On the local level Schou was a member of the executive committee of Spydeberg municipal council from 1991 to 2003. For the periods 2003-2007 and 2007-2011 Schou represents the Conservative Party in the municipal council in Spydeberg.

Before entering politics Schou worked as a nurse before becoming a health bureaucrat. She is married to Petter Schou, county doctor in Oslo and Akershus.

She served as the Fourth Vice President of the Storting from 2013–2017, and as the Fifth Vice President from 2020 to 2021.

References

1955 births
Living people
Members of the Storting
Government ministers of Norway
Conservative Party (Norway) politicians
Østfold politicians
University of Oslo alumni
People from Sarpsborg
Norwegian Christians
Women government ministers of Norway
20th-century Norwegian women politicians
20th-century Norwegian politicians
21st-century Norwegian politicians
21st-century Norwegian women politicians
Women members of the Storting